The Greatest Adventure may refer to:

 The Greatest Adventure: Stories from the Bible, a Hanna-Barbera animated series released direct-to-video from 1985 to 1992 
 "The Greatest Adventure" (song), a song from the 1977 Rankin/Bass film The Hobbit
 The Greatest Adventure (comic book), a 2017—2018 comic book limited series published by Dynamite Entertainment, featuring Edgar Rice Burroughs characters and concepts